The 1939 Pau Grand Prix was a motor race held on 2 April 1939 at the Pau circuit, in Pau, Pyrénées-Atlantiques, France. The Grand Prix was won by Hermann Lang, driving the Mercedes-Benz W154. Manfred von Brauchitsch finished second and Philippe Étancelin third.

With the event of World War II, this would be the last Pau Grand Prix until 1947, two years after the war ended.

Classification

Race

References

Pau Grand Prix
1939 in French motorsport